Shattered Idols is a 1922 American drama film directed by Edward Sloman and written by William V. Mong. It is based on the 1912 novel The Daughter of Brahma by I. A. R. Wylie. The film stars Marguerite De La Motte, William V. Mong, James W. Morrison, Frankie Lee, Ethel Grey Terry, and Alfred Allen. The film was released on February 6, 1922, by Associated First National Pictures.

Plot
As described in a film magazine, Jean Hurst (Terry), a British army officer's wife in India, on the eve of the birth of her child, finds her husband dead, murdered on their doorstep. The child is born a cripple, and is a weakling and coward. Grown to manhood, because of his mother's hatred, David (Morrison) denounces the association of white people in the colony and marries Sarasvati (De La Motte), the goddess of a tribe that plans to overthrow their English rulers. Inheriting an estate and title in England, his mother hopes he will divorce his wife and marry the daughter of an army officer, but he remains steadfast. Learning of the sudden uprising of the native people, he risks his life to warn the British soldiers. When he returns to his bride, he finds that she has sacrificed her life for his.

Cast      
Marguerite De La Motte as Sarasvati
William V. Mong as Rama Pal
James W. Morrison as Lt. Walter Hurst / David Hurst
Frankie Lee as David Hurst
Ethel Grey Terry as Jean Hurst
Alfred Allen as The Judge
Louise Lovely as Diana Chichester
Harvey Clark as Col. Chichester
Josephine Crowell as Mrs. Chichester
Robert Littlefield as Dick Hathaway
Mary Wynn as Ethel Hathaway
George Periolat as The High Priest
Tom Ricketts as Rev. Dr. Romney

References

External links

1922 films
1920s English-language films
Silent American drama films
1922 drama films
First National Pictures films
Films directed by Edward Sloman
American silent feature films
American black-and-white films
Films based on works by I. A. R. Wylie
1920s American films